Sociedad Deportiva Indautxu is a Spanish football club based in Bilbao, in the autonomous community of Basque Country. Founded in 1924, it plays in Vizcaya Group of Territorial Preferente, holding home games at Campo Iparralde. 
 
Apart from football, the club also promotes other sports such as boxing and swimming.

History
Indautxu was founded in 1924, was disbanded in 1929, and then reformed in 1940, also being referred to as Sociedad Deportiva Indauchu.

In 1955–56's second division, with former Athletic Bilbao players Telmo Zarra and José Luis Panizo in the squad, and with another, Rafael Iriondo, as coach, the team made its debuts in the Spanish second division, finishing third in 1956–57 and 1958–59, and fourth in 1957–58. 

Indautxu maintained its division status until the Segunda Division status until the 1966–67 season, returning for the last time in 1968–69, and meeting the same fate.

Season to season

13 seasons in Segunda División
18 seasons in Tercera División

Famous players
 José Eulogio Gárate
   Unai Laka
 Raimundo Lezama
 José Luis Panizo
 Chus Pereda
 Telmo Zarra

Famous coaches
 Rafael Iriondo
 Serafín González

External links
Official website 

Sports teams in Bilbao
Football clubs in the Basque Country (autonomous community)
Divisiones Regionales de Fútbol clubs
Association football clubs established in 1924
1924 establishments in Spain
Segunda División clubs